Tigridia matudae is a rare plant species known from only two locations in Mexico, in a small region along the boundary between the State of Mexico and Morelos. Both sites are at high elevations in the mountains, at altitudes of 2900–3000 m, in forests of Pinus and Abies. One is within Zempoala Lakes National Park. The species is a bulb-forming perennial up to 90 cm tall. Leaves are narrow and tapering. Flowers are pale lilac, up to 3 cm in diameter, blooming in August and September.

References

Iridaceae
Flora of the State of Mexico
Flora of Morelos